These are the rosters of all participating teams at the women's water polo tournament at the 2009 World Aquatics Championships held between July 19–31 in Rome, Italy.

































See also
Water polo at the 2009 World Aquatics Championships – Men's team rosters

References

External links
Official website
Records and statistics (reports by Omega)

World Aquatics Championships water polo squads
Women's team rosters
2009 in women's water polo